Raoul Sabine "Robert" Burnard ( 1902 – 8 November 1950) was an English stage and radio actor best known for starring in several Crawford Productions radio plays in Australia. He was Sabine Baring-Gould's grandson.

Burnard attended Haileybury College and Cambridge University, after which he worked with the diplomatic corps in China, Persia, and Japan. A graduate of the Royal Academy of Dramatic Art, he co-starred with Marie Tempest and Maurice Moscovitch in the West End theatre. He later went to Hollywood and served as an assistant director to Eric von Stroheim. In Australia, he worked with Crawford Productions and played lead characters, including the Toff, in several radio plays over 3DB. Another character he played was Sylvanus Haythorpe, from Old English by John Galsworthy.

He died in Melbourne, Australia.

References

1900s births
1950 deaths
English male radio actors
Alumni of RADA
British emigrants to Australia